Justice Gregory may refer to:

George Gregory Jr., associate justice and Chief Justice on the South Carolina Supreme Court
Hardy Gregory Jr., associate justice of the Supreme Court of Georgia
Herbert B. Gregory, associate justice of the Supreme Court of Appeals of Virginia
Robert Gregory (Indiana judge), associate justice of the Supreme Court of Indiana